Pterocaulon sphacelatum, commonly known as apple bush or fruit-salad plant, is a species of flowering plant in the family Asteraceae. It is an upright shrub with mostly pink to purple flowers and is endemic to Australia.

Description
The outer bracts are spoon-shaped, inner bracts linear-lance shaped and whitish to pink and the florets pink to purple. The "applebush" is an aromatic plant is used in Australian Aboriginal medicine.

Taxonomy and naming
The species was first formally described by Jacques Labillardière as Monenteles sphacelatus. In 1882 Ferdinand von Mueller changed the name to Pterocaulon sphacelatum and attributed the change to George Bentham and the description was published in Systematic Census of Australian Plants.The specific epithet (sphacelatum) means "brown or blackish speckling".

Distribution and habitat 
Applebush grows in a variety of habitats, mostly on occasional flooded locations, disturbed sites including roadsides in Western Australia, Queensland, New South Wales, Victoria and the Northern Territory.

References

sphacelatum
Asterales of Australia
Medicinal plants
Flora of Queensland
Eudicots of Western Australia
Flora of South Australia
Flora of the Northern Territory